Masala is a Canadian drama film, directed by Srinivas Krishna and released in 1991.

The film stars Krishna as a character named Krishna, an orphan in Toronto whose parents and siblings were killed several years earlier in an airline explosion while travelling back to India for a family visit, and is now cleaning up his act after several years living on the streets as a drug addict and criminal. The film also stars Zohra Sehgal as his grandmother; Saeed Jaffrey in a triple role as his uncle Lallu, a postal worker named Hariprasad and the Hindu god Krishna; and Sakina Jaffrey as Rita, Hariprasad's daughter.

The film received the Samuelson Award at the Birmingham International Film and Television Festival in 1991, and Saeed Jaffrey received a Genie Award nomination for Best Actor at the 12th Genie Awards.

References

External links

1991 films
Canadian drama films
Films set in Toronto
Films shot in Toronto
Films about Indian Canadians
1990s English-language films
Films about terrorism in India
Hindu mythology in popular culture
Krishna in popular culture
Air India Flight 182
1990s Canadian films